The 1986 Lipton International Players Championships was a tennis tournament played on outdoor hard courts. It was the 2nd edition of the Miami Masters and was part of the 1986 Nabisco Grand Prix and the 1985 Virginia Slims World Championship Series. Both the men's and the women's events took place in Boca West, Florida from February 10 through February 24, 1986.

Finals

Men's singles

 Ivan Lendl defeated  Mats Wilander 3–6, 6–1, 7–6, 6–4
 It was Lendl's 2nd title of the year and the 59th of his career.

Women's singles

 Chris Evert Lloyd defeated  Steffi Graf 6–4, 6–2
 It was Evert Lloyd's 1st title of the year and the 146th of her career.

Men's doubles

 Brad Gilbert /  Vince Van Patten defeated  Stefan Edberg /  Anders Järryd by walkover
 It was Gilbert's 1st title of the year and the 8th of his career. It was Van Patten's only title of the year and the 2nd of his career.

Women's doubles

 Pam Shriver /  Helena Suková defeated  Chris Evert Lloyd /  Wendy Turnbull 6–2, 6–3
 It was Shriver's 1st title of the year and the 79th of her career. It was Suková's 1st title of the year and the 13th of her career.

References

External links 
 ATP tournament profile
 WTA tournament draws
 ITF women's tournament edition details

 
Lipton International Players Championships
Lipton International Players Championships
Miami Open (tennis)
Lipton International Players Championships
Lipton International
Lipton International Players Championships